Ballygunge Government High School (BGHS) is a school in West Bengal, India. This is a boys' only school for secondary and higher secondary level students. Its medium of instruction is English. It was once considered one of the best Bengali medium schools in Kolkata and continues to be a good one. The campus includes a fairly large play-ground and the school offers variety of extracurricular activities for its students. The school has produced many well known academics, film and theater personalities, journalist and musicians. 
Currently, there are over 1200 students enrolled at this school. The school is adjacent to Kolkata Regional Transport Office (RTO)/Ballygunge police station and Kolkata Motor Vehicles Department.

Classes
Class Prep-1 to Class 5 are taught in the morning section, while classes 6 to 12 are conducted in the day section.

Every year the classes are taken by trainee teachers for some time, as, Govt of West Bengal had set up a Teachers' Training College name David Hare Training College (now under WBUTTPEA). To facilitate the trainee teachers, an idea of starting a Model School came to the authorities and eventually a school was established just behind the Teachers' Training College, exactly as per the copy book of an ideal School. Hence Ballygunge Govt. High School came into being in 1927 and the first batch of School Final candidates came out in 1928.

Notable alumni

Ajit Kumar Banerjee - Environmentalist
Gautam Bhattacharya - Sports journalist
Nabarun Bhattacharya - Novelist
R.D. Burman - Film score composer and music director
Rajat Kanta Ray - Historian
Rajatava Dutta - Actor
Ritwik Ghatak - Filmmaker and script-writer
Rupankar Bagchi - Singer
Satyajit Ray - Author, composer, lyricist, poet and filmmaker
Sombhu Mitra - Actor, director
Subrata Mitra - Cinematographer
Sukhamoy Chakraborty - Economist
Partha Sarathi Gupta - Historian
Surajit Chandra Sinha - Anthropologist
Tapan Raychaudhuri - Historian
Sekhar Basu - Indian Nuclear Scientist.

References

External links
BGHS Alumni Association 

Boys' schools in India
Primary schools in West Bengal
High schools and secondary schools in Kolkata
Educational institutions established in 1927
1927 establishments in British India